Michael Joseph Pasternak (born 26 December 1942), known by his stage name Emperor Rosko, is an American presenter of rock music programmes, most widely known for his shows on Radio Caroline and BBC Radio 1 in the UK in the 1960s and early 1970s.

Early life
Born in Los Angeles, California, he is the son of Hollywood film producer Joe Pasternak. He was influenced in his career choice by KYA Radio disc jockeys Lord Tim Hudson and Wolfman Jack in Los Angeles. Pasternak's opportunity to broadcast came when he was in the US Navy, where he presented a show on the aircraft carrier , using the name Michael Prescott. He then moved to Europe and hosted sponsored programmes in France and Andorra.

Origin of stage name
In an interview with Chris Edwards, for Offshore Echoes, Rosko explained: "I used to listen to a guy named Roscoe, who used to listen to a guy called Boscoe and the double-syllable name ending in "o" was synonymous with rhythm and rhyme which was a precursor to rap. I also used to listen to several other people like Wolfman, Tom Donahue, etc. So I took a little bit of everybody and became Emperor Rosko to distinguish myself from all the others."

Offshore radio
He joined Radio Caroline, a pirate radio station broadcasting from a ship off the coast of Britain, in April 1966. There, his American-influenced quick presentation style soon made him one of the station's best-loved DJs. He was often joined on air by his mynah bird Alfie. After his time at Radio Caroline, speaking fluent French, he presented for French-language stations Radio Monte Carlo and Radio Luxembourg as "Le Président Rosko".

Rosko compered the Stax/Volt Tour of Europe in 1967 and can be heard introducing Booker T. & the M.G.'s, the Bar-Kays, Carla Thomas, Eddie Floyd, Sam & Dave, and Otis Redding on the two-album set The Stax/Volt Tour in London, recorded at the Finsbury Park Astoria (later the Rainbow Theatre) on 17 March 1967. It is Rosko who can be heard introducing Redding and encouraging the crowd to chant and spell his name on Redding's album Live in Europe, recorded on 17 March and 21 March 1967.

Return to Radio Caroline
On January 9, 2023, it was announced that Rosko was to re-join Radio Caroline. In a statement on their website the station stated that Rosko will present monthly breakfast shows under the Radio Caroline North link up with Manx Radio.

BBC career
As a disc jockey with BBC Radio 1 at its launch in September 1967, Rosko initially recorded shows in France for the Midday Spin programme. On his first Midday Spin show, Rosko introduced himself with "I am the Emperor, the geeter with the heater, your leader, your groovy host from the West Coast, here to clear up your skin and mess up your mind. It'll make you feel good all over." He highlighted the new Motown, reggae and rock music.

Rosko moved to the UK in 1968 and from 1970 presented Radio 1's Friday Roundtable, in which new records were reviewed by a panel of guests. He also presented in a Saturday lunchtime slot. Together with fellow Radio 1 DJ Dave Lee Travis, he launched the first mobile discothèque, the "Rosko International Roadshow". He stayed with Radio 1 until September 1976, when he left for America to rejoin his father, who was suffering from Parkinson's disease. Around 1975, he briefly hosted Crackerjack on BBC Television with Little & Large. During that year he also presented a few editions of Top of the Pops, including the edition broadcast on 10 April.

When Rosko returned to Europe, he was heard via recorded shows on Radio Luxembourg. In 1981 he returned to Radio 1 for a 13-week Sunday series of shows, and continued to broadcast at weekends during the Summer for four years until left Radio 1 in 1982. In 1988, he returned to Radio 1 to help celebrate the 21st birthday of the station. In 1992, he helped celebrate the station's 25th birthday with a special broadcast, before joining Virgin Radio 1215 in April 1993.

Since 2000
From October 2001, Rosko was heard on the now defunct Classic Gold Digital, and REM.FM, his programme being pre-recorded in California. He also ran his own soul station "Rosko Radio" for Internet broadcaster Live365, which aired its final broadcasts in December 2007. There was no sponsor and the free distribution was challenged by the societies of authors and composers in the US based on complaints of unfair competition for FM radio. The service continued in podcast form.

He also broadcasts a programme called "The LA Connection" from his studios in California, which in 2012 could be heard in the UK on 96.5 Bolton FM, Radio Scarborough, Zack FM 105.3 in East Anglia, Forest FM 92.3 in Verwood, Dorset, Vixen 101 in East Yorkshire, Belfast 89 and across Europe on several stations including Central FM in southern Spain, and Radio Ayia Napa in Cyprus.

On 11 April 2009, Rosko presented a three-hour show within a BBC-sponsored commemorative broadcast from the lightship LV18 berthed at Harwich. Since then, Rosko has been heard regularly on the internet broadcaster Big L International.

He makes occasional Sunday broadcasts for the radio station The Mighty KBC on 6095 kHz (49m shortwave) in Europe.

On 14 August 2017, Emperor Rosko made a special guest broadcast on Radio Caroline to mark the 50th anniversary of the Marine Offences Act 1967.

In 2018, Rosko joined the line-up for the new United DJs DAB and online radio station.

In 2021, Rosko has joined the team of presenters for Manchester's Tameside Radio, playing an array of American country music.

Film
Rosko was the inspiration for the Philip Seymour Hoffman character "The Count" in the comedy film The Boat That Rocked, known as Pirate Radio in the United States.

Singles Discography

Awards
2008 – at a lunch in December, inducted into the Radio Academy Hall of Fame
2011 – Lifetime Achievement Award at the International Radio Festival in Zurich.

Publications
His book Emperor Rosko's DJ Book was published by Everest in March 1976.  It was re-published, with additional material, as an eBook in October 2012.

References

External links
 

1942 births
American people of Hungarian-Jewish descent
American expatriates in the United Kingdom
American radio DJs
BBC Radio 1 presenters
Living people
Offshore radio broadcasters
Pirate radio personalities
Radio Luxembourg (English) presenters
Top of the Pops presenters